The American Institute of Certified Public Accountants (AICPA) is the national professional organization of Certified Public Accountants (CPAs) in the United States, with more than 428,000 members in 130 countries. Founded in 1887 as the American Association of Public Accountants (AAPA), the organization sets ethical standards and U.S. auditing standards. It also develops and grades the Uniform CPA Examination. The AICPA maintains offices in New York City; Washington, DC; Durham, NC; and Ewing, NJ.

History

The AICPA and its predecessors date back to 1887, when the American Association of Public Accountants (AAPA) was formed. The Association went through several name changes over the years: the Institute of Public Accountants (1916), the American Institute of Accountants (1917), and the American Society of Public Accountants (1921), which merged into the American Institute of Accountants in 1936. At that time, the decision was made to restrict future membership to CPAs.

In January 2012, the AICPA entered into a joint venture with their equivalent in the UK, the Chartered Institute of Management Accountants (CIMA), a partnership that produced the Chartered Global Management Accountant (CGMA) designation. In 2014, the AICPA and the CIMA co-created the Global Management Accounting Principles (GMAPs).

The AICPA and CIMA membership bodies remain and provide all existing benefits to members.

In August 2019, the AICPA proposed a new standard to give auditors more guidance on auditing accounting estimates. This standard replaced SAS No. 122, Section 540, Auditing Accounting Estimates, Including Fair Value Accounting Estimates, and Related Disclosures. It also amended a few other sections of the AICPA Professional Standards.

History of committees
The number of committees grew continually over the years. In the 1940s, there were 34 committees. By 1960, there were 89. By 1970, the number had grown to 109.

In 1999, the nearly 120 existing committees underwent a re-organization with approximately half of the standing committees being replaced with a volunteer group model that placed an increased emphasis on the use of task forces. The increased use of task forces allowed for more targeted efforts with the task forces being given a specific assignment then disbanding upon completion of that assignment. Also in 1999, the first tracking and management of task forces began."

The Uniform CPA Examination 
The Uniform CPA Examination must be taken and passed by all CPAs who wish to be licensed. The exam is developed and scored by the Board of Examiners (BOE), a committee that consists of CPAs, state board regulators, psychometricians, and educators.

Professional standards setting

The AICPA sets generally accepted professional and technical standards for CPAs in multiple areas. Until the 1970s, the AICPA held a virtual monopoly in this field. In the 1970s, however, it transferred its responsibility for setting generally accepted accounting principles (GAAP) to the newly formed Financial Accounting Standards Board (FASB). Following this, it retained its standards setting function in areas such as financial statement auditing, professional ethics, attest services, CPA firm quality control, CPA tax practice, business valuation, and financial planning practice. Before passage of the Sarbanes-Oxley law, AICPA standards in these areas were considered "generally accepted" for all CPA practitioners.

In the early 2000s, in response to events such as Enron's announcement that its financial statements couldn't be relied on and WorldCom's bankruptcy filing, Congress passed the Sarbanes-Oxley Act of 2002 (SOX).

Credentials, designations, and scholarships

The AICPA offers credentialing programs in certain subject areas for its members. The credentials are similar to state board certifications for attorneys, which also recognize subject matter-specific expertise. The AICPA offers the Certified Public Accountant, Accredited in Business Valuation (ABV) credential, the Personal Financial Specialist (PFS) credential, the Certified in Financial Forensics (CFF) credential, the Certified Information Technology Professional (CITP) credential, and the Certified in Entity and Intangible Valuations (CEIV) credential. The CITP was established in 2000.

The AICPA, along with CIMA, issues the Chartered Global Management Accountant (CGMA) designation, which was established in 2012. Based on global quality standards for ethics and performance, CGMA designees are considered experts with credibility of advanced proficiency in finance, operations, strategy and management.

The Institute offers a number of scholarships for high school students, undergraduate and graduate students, and working professionals. This includes:

 The AICPA Foundation High School Scholarship
 The AICPA Legacy Scholarships
 The Minority Doctoral Fellowship Program
 The William (Bill) Ezzell Scholarship Program

Public interest campaigns
The AICPA also runs public interest programs, including the Feed the Pig campaign and the 360 Degrees of Financial Literacy site. Feed the Pig, a national public service campaign sponsored by the AICPA and the Ad Council, provides personal finance resources for young Americans. 360 Degrees of Financial Literacy is a national volunteer effort of the nation's CPAs to help Americans understand their personal finances and develop money management skills.

In 2022, the AICPA and the National Association of State Boards Accountancy announced that a new Uniform CPA exam would be released in 2024 as part of the CPA Evolution initiative. The new exam is based on a “Core + Discipline” model and will include core testing in accounting, auditing, and tax, as well as three Discipline sections (candidates must select one to complete).

Government relations program
The AICPA has a Washington office and a political action committee. On behalf of its members, the AICPA monitors and advocates on legislative and other matters that affect the accounting profession. Working with state CPA societies and other professional organizations, the AICPA provides information to and educates federal, state and local policymakers regarding key issues. Whether serving as an information resource or offering recommendations, the AICPA represents the profession while protecting the public interest.

The AICPA's Political Action Committee is a contributor to U.S. Congressional representatives and Senators from both parties who sit on various legislative committees of relevance to CPAs.

External roles
The AICPA is a leading member of the International Federation of Accountants and the Global Accounting Alliance, and the Tax Professionals United for Taxpayer Relief Coalition.

The AICPA is an affiliate of the Institute of Chartered Accountants of the Caribbean.

Code of professional conduct
Members of the AICPA must attest annually to meeting the requirements for their membership types, complying with the AICPA's bylaws and upholding the AICPA's Code of Profession Conduct. Members are subject to audit and, if found to be non-compliant, may be expelled from the AICPA.

AICPA personal financial satisfaction index 
Since Q3 of 2018, AICPA has been publishing the personal financial satisfaction index on a quarterly basis that indicates the general understanding of economic factors affecting the financial standing of a typical American. As the COVID-19 pandemic has strained the U.S. economy and put millions out of work, Americans have experienced the biggest drop in their personal financial satisfaction in more than a decade. The AICPA’s Q1 2020 Personal Financial Satisfaction index (PFSi) measures 32.9, a 20 percent (8.29 point) decrease from the previous quarter. This is the largest quarterly drop the PFSi has experienced since the Great Recession (Q4 2009).

See also
 AICPA Code of Professional Conduct
 Center for Audit Quality (CAQ)
 FASB
 GASB
 IASB
 Philosophy of Accounting
 Chartered Institute of Management Accountants

References

External links
 
 The AICPA Collection (MUM00658) at the University of Mississippi, Archives and Special Collections

Accounting in the United States
Professional associations based in the United States
Companies based in Durham, North Carolina
Member bodies of the International Federation of Accountants
Professional accounting bodies